Clarence Nyipie, sometimes written Nypie (born 3 April 1999) is a New Caledonian footballer who plays as a defender for New Caledonian club Lossi and the New Caledonian national team.

Club career
Poma started his career in the youth of Païta. In 2015 he moved to the first team and made his debut. In January 2018 he moved to Lössi to play with them in the 2018 OFC Champions League.

National team
In 2017 Nyipie was called up for the New Caledonia national football team. He made his debut on December 5, 2017, in a 2–1 loss against Tuvalu when he played the whole 90 minutes.

Personal life
Clarence has a younger brother called Cyrill Nyipie, he has played at the 2017 FIFA U-17 World Cup and he has had a trial with Ligue 1 side AS Saint-Étienne.

References

New Caledonian footballers
Association football defenders
New Caledonia international footballers
Living people
1999 births
AS Lössi players